Allen Kenji Ono (December 31, 1933 – August 1, 2016) was a lieutenant general in the United States Army. He was born and raised in Honolulu, Hawaii. He attended the University of Hawaii and received a bachelor of arts degree in government in 1955. Ono received a master of science degree in communications from Shippensburg State College and a degree from Northwestern University's executive management program.

Ono served as commanding officer of the Army Recruiting Command from June 1985 to June 1987. He was promoted to lieutenant general in 1987. He was deputy chief of staff for personnel at U.S. Army Headquarters from 1987 to 1990. In this capacity, he directed the Army's military and civilian personnel operations. Ono was the first Japanese American lieutenant general as well as the first Asian American lieutenant general. He died in 2016 and was buried at Punchbowl National Cemetery.

References

1933 births
2016 deaths
People from Honolulu
American military personnel of Japanese descent
University of Hawaiʻi at Mānoa alumni
United States Army personnel of the Vietnam War
Shippensburg University of Pennsylvania alumni
Recipients of the Meritorious Service Medal (United States)
Recipients of the Legion of Merit
United States Army generals
Recipients of the Distinguished Service Medal (US Army)